A Year of Songs is the debut studio album by English comedian and actor Alexander Armstrong. The album was released on 6 November 2015 by Rhino and East West. It debuted at six on the UK Albums Chart, and at one on the Official Classical Artist Albums Chart.

As of November 2016, the album has sold 187,671 copies in the UK.

Track listing

Charts

Weekly charts

Year-end charts

References

2015 debut albums
Alexander Armstrong albums
2015 classical albums
Rhino Entertainment albums
East West Records albums